A  (Ashkenazi pronunciation , plural:   ,  , "circumciser") is a Jew trained in the practice of , the "covenant of circumcision".

Etymology

The noun appeared for the first time in the 4th century as the title of a circumciser (Shabbat (Talmud) 156a).

Origins of circumcision in Judaism

For Jews, male circumcision is mandatory as it is prescribed in the Torah. In the Book of Genesis, it is described as a mark of the covenant of the pieces between Yahweh and the descendants of Abraham: 

In Leviticus:

Functions
Biblically, the infant's father is commanded to perform the circumcision himself. The  is specially trained in circumcision and the rituals surrounding the procedure. Many  are doctors or rabbis (and some are both) or cantors and are required to receive appropriate training both from the religious and medical fields.

Traditionally, the  uses a scalpel to circumcise the newborn. Today, doctors and some non-Orthodox  use a perforating clamp before they cut the skin. The clamp makes it easier to be precise and shortens recovery time.

Under Jewish law, a  must draw blood from the circumcision wound. Most  do it by hand with a suction device, but some follow the traditional practice of doing it by mouth. The Centers for Disease Control and Prevention issued a warning in 2012 about the health implications of the latter practice, citing 11 cases of neonatal Herpes simplex virus (HSV) and two recorded fatalities. A 2013 review of cases of neonatal HSV infections in Israel identified ritual circumcision as the source of HSV-1 transmission in 31.8% of the cases.

Even up until today, many  list the names and birthdates of the boys they circumcise in little booklets. These books have become important documents for genealogical scholarship. Increasingly, these notes on circumcision are being digitalized.

Female 
According to traditional Jewish law, in the absence of a Jewish male expert, a woman that has the required skills is also authorized to perform the circumcision, provided that she is Jewish. In 1984, Dr. Deborah Cohen became the first certified Reform Jewish ; she was certified by the Berit Mila Program of Reform Judaism.

In popular culture
 In the popular sitcom Seinfeld, a  played by Charles Levin appears in the episode The Bris.
 "Weird Al" Yankovic's song Pretty Fly for a Rabbi, a parody of Pretty Fly (For a White Guy), contains the line "The parents pay the mohel and he gets to the keep the tip!"

References

External links

 
Jewish religious occupations